Anna Lee, MBE (born Joan Boniface Winnifrith; 2 January 1913 – 14 May 2004) was a British actress, labelled by studios "The British Bombshell".

Early life
Anna Lee was born Joan Boniface Winnifrith in Ightham, (pronounced 'Item'), Kent, the daughter of Bertram Thomas Winnifrith, a headmaster and Anglican rector, and his second wife, Edith Maude Digby-Roper. Her father supported his daughter in her desire to become an actress. Lee's grandfather, Reverend Alfred Winnifrith, was Rector of Mariansleigh. During WWI, he provided for Belgian refugees and was awarded the Medaille du Roi Albert. Lee's brother, Sir John Winnifrith, was a senior British civil servant who became permanent secretary at the Ministry of Agriculture. She was the goddaughter of Sir Arthur Conan Doyle and lifelong friend of his daughter, Dame Jean Conan Doyle.

Career

Britain
Lee trained at the Central School of Speech Training and Dramatic Art at the Royal Albert Hall, and made her debut with a bit part in His Lordship (1932), when she was 19. She played a number of minor, often uncredited, roles in films during the early 1930s. Lee began to get more prominent roles in films to satisfy the Cinematograph Films Act of 1927 (17 & 18 Geo. V), which was an act of the United Kingdom Parliament designed to stimulate the declining British film industry. She was known for her roles in films set amongst the wealthy, particularly in Chelsea Life (1933), in which she starred with Louis Hayward.

In 1934, Lee signed a contract with Gainsborough Pictures, the biggest British production company of the era. She played leading lady roles in a variety of different genres at Gainsborough, including the comedy-thriller The Camels Are Coming, the drama The Passing of the Third Floor Back, the horror film The Man Who Changed His Mind and the war film OHMS. She appeared in the 1935 Jessie Matthews musical First a Girl as the aristocratic playgirl and other woman, Princess Miranoff. In 1937, she starred in one of the studio's large-budget productions, King Solomon's Mines.

In 1933, Lee met the director Robert Stevenson, who became her first husband, while shooting The Camels Are Coming on location in Egypt. In 1937, she starred in his picture, Non-Stop New York, for Gaumont British. During 1938, she took time off from acting to give birth to her first child. In 1939, Lee and her husband switched to Ealing Studios run by Michael Balcon, the former head of Gainsborough. She played a 19th-century Irish music hall performer who falls in love with an aristocrat in the comedy Young Man's Fancy (1939) and a journalist who helps heroes thwart a foreign enemy's plot against Britain in The Four Just Men (1939).

Her final film in Britain was Return to Yesterday, a film about a young repertory theatre actress who falls in love with a Hollywood star she meets while touring in a small seaside town. Lee and Stevenson emigrated to the United States, her husband having gained a contract with David O. Selznick. She remained supportive of the British war effort during World War II, and in 1943 appeared alongside other British actors in Forever and a Day, a film made to raise money for British charities.

United States
After her move to Hollywood, she became associated with John Ford, appearing in several of his films, including How Green Was My Valley, Two Rode Together and Fort Apache. She co-starred with John Wayne and John Carroll in Flying Tigers (1942).

She worked for producer Val Lewton in the horror/thriller Bedlam (1946) and had a lead role opposite Brian Donlevy and Walter Brennan in Fritz Lang's Hangmen Also Die! (1943), a wartime thriller relating to the assassination of Reinhard Heydrich. Lee made frequent appearances on television anthology series in the 1940s and 1950s, including Robert Montgomery Presents, The Ford Theatre Hour, Kraft Television Theatre, Armstrong Circle Theatre and Wagon Train. She made a guest appearance on Perry Mason as Crystal Durham in "The Case of the Unsuitable Uncle" (1962).  She guest starred on Alfred Hitchcock Presents in the 1963 episode “Last Seen Wearing Blue Jeans” (S1E28). 

In 1958, she returned to Britain to appear in John Ford's Gideon's Day, in which she played the detective's wife. She had a small role as Sister Margaretta in The Sound of Music, one of the two nuns who thwarted the Nazis by removing car engine parts, allowing the Von Trapps to escape. Lee appeared in What Ever Happened to Baby Jane? (1962) in a small role as Mrs. Bates, a neighbour of the sisters played by Joan Crawford and Bette Davis. In 1994, Lee took the leading role in the feature film What Can I Do?, directed by Wheeler Winston Dixon.

In later years, she became known as matriarch Lila Quartermaine on General Hospital and Port Charles. Lila was a contract role until 2003, when Lee was taken off contract and dropped to recurring status by Jill Farren-Phelps, a move widely protested in the soap world. According to fellow General Hospital actress Leslie Charleson, Lee had been promised a job for life by former General Hospital executive producer Wendy Riche. When interviewed in 2007, Charleson said, "The woman was in her 90s. And then when the new powers-that-be took over they fired her, and it broke her heart. It was not necessary."

Personal life
Lee married her first husband, the director Robert Stevenson, in 1933 and moved to Hollywood in 1939. They had two daughters, Venetia and Caroline. Venetia Stevenson, a former actress, was married to Don Everly of the Everly Brothers and has three children, Edan, Erin, and Stacy. Lee and Stevenson divorced in March 1944, with Venetia and Caroline electing to live with their father. Lee met her second husband, George Stafford, as the pilot of the plane on her USO tour during the Second World War. They married on 8 June 1944, and had three sons, John, Stephen and Tim Stafford.

Tim Stafford is an actor under the stage name of Jeffrey Byron. Lee and Stafford divorced in 1964. Her final marriage, to novelist Robert Nathan (The Bishop's Wife, Portrait of Jennie), on 5 April 1970, ended at his death in 1985. Lee became a naturalised US citizen under the name Joanna Boniface Stafford (#123624) on 6 April 1945; certificate issued 8 June 1945 (#6183889, Los Angeles, California).

In the 1930s, Lee occupied a house at 49 Bankside in London; she was later interviewed by writer Gillian Tindall for a book written about the address, The House by the Thames, released in 2006. Since built in 1710, the house had served as a home for coal merchants, an office, a boarding house, a hangout for derelicts and finally once again a private residence in the 1900s. The house is listed in tour guides as a famous residence and has been variously claimed as possibly being home to Christopher Wren during the construction of St. Paul's Cathedral.

In 1981, a car accident left her paralysed from the waist down.

Lee was a staunch Conservative and stated that her views coincided with those of Sir Winston Churchill.

Awards and honours
In 1982 she was awarded an MBE, after fundraising for the White Cliffs at Dover and Ightham Mote. In 1995, her star was installed on Hollywood's Walk of Fame. On 21 May 2004, she was posthumously awarded a Daytime Emmy Lifetime Achievement Award; she was scheduled for months to receive the award, but died from pneumonia at age 91 before she could receive it. Her son, Jeffrey Byron, accepted the award on her behalf. On 16 July 2004, General Hospital aired a tribute to Lee by holding a memorial service for Lila Quartermaine.

Filmography

Film

Television
{| class="wikitable"
|-
!style="background:#B0C4DE;" | Year
!style="background:#B0C4DE;" | Title
!style="background:#B0C4DE;" | Role
!style="background:#B0C4DE;" | Notes 
|-
|1950 || Robert Montgomery Presents || Frances Lawrence || 1 episode
|-
|1951 || Studio One ||Anita Derr || 1 episode 
|-
|1952 || Robert Montgomery Presents || Ann Hammond || 2 episodes
|-
|rowspan=2|1958 || Peter Gunn ||Sister Thomas Aquina || 1 episode 
|-
| ’'Perry Mason || Lucille Alfred || 1 episode
|-
|1960 ||The Barbara Stanwyck Show || ||1 episode
|-
|rowspan=2|1962 || Perry Mason || Crystal Durham || 1 episode
|-
| McHale's Navy || Pamela Parfrey || 1 episode (Christmas) 11
|-
|1963 || The Alfred Hitchcock Hour ||Roberta Saunders || 1 episode
|-
|1964 || The Movie Maker || || TV movie
|-
|1965 ||Combat! || Sister Lescaut ||(episode: "The Enemy")
|-
|1966 ||My Three Sons|| Louise Allen|| 1 episode
|-
|1967 || Gunsmoke ||Amy Bassett || 1 episode 
|-
|1968 || Mannix "Edge of the Knife" ||Mrs Harriman || Season 2 Episode 07 
|-
|1970 || Mission: Impossible ||Maria Malik|| (episode: "The Martyr")
|-
|1973 || My Darling Daughters' Anniversary || Judge Barbara Hanline || TV movie
|-
|1977 || Eleanor and Franklin: The White House Years || Laura Delano || TV movie
|-
|1978 || The Beasts Are on the Streets || Mrs Jackson ||TV movie
|-
|1979–2003 || General Hospital || Lila Quartermaine || (final appearance)
|-
|1980 || Scruples ||Aunt Wilhelmina || 3 episodes 
|-
|1997 || Port Charles || Lila Quartermaine ||
|}

References

Sources
Chibnall, Steve. Quota Quickies: The Birth of the British 'B' Film. British Film Institute, 2007.
 Richards, Jeffrey (ed.). The Unknown 1930s: An Alternative History of the British Cinema, 1929–1939''. I.B. Tauris & Co, 1998.

External links

Photos of Anna Lee in 'Hangmen Also Die' by Ned Scott

1913 births
2004 deaths
Alumni of the Royal Central School of Speech and Drama
British emigrants to the United States
British film actresses
British soap opera actresses
British television actresses
Deaths from pneumonia in California
Daytime Emmy Award winners
Members of the Order of the British Empire
People from Ightham
People with acquired American citizenship
20th-century American actresses
21st-century American women
20th-century English actresses
20th-century British businesspeople